Intuition in the context of decision-making is defined as a "non-sequential information-processing mode." It is distinct from insight (a much more protracted process) and can be contrasted with the deliberative style of decision-making. Intuition can influence judgment through either emotion or cognition, and there has been some suggestion that it may be a means of bridging the two. Individuals use intuition and more deliberative decision-making styles interchangeably, but there has been some evidence that people tend to gravitate to one or the other style more naturally. People in a good mood gravitate toward intuitive styles, while people in a bad mood tend to become more deliberative. The specific ways in which intuition actually influences decisions remain poorly understood.

Definition and related terms
Intuitive decision-making can be described as the process by which information acquired through associated learning and stored in long-term memory is accessed unconsciously to form the basis of a judgment or decision.  This information can be transferred through affect induced by exposure to available options, or through unconscious cognition. Intuition is based on the implicit knowledge available to the decision-maker. For example, owning a dog as a child imbues someone with implicit knowledge about canine behavior, which may then be channeled into a decision-making process as the emotion of fear or anxiety before taking a certain kind of action around an angry dog. Intuition is the mechanism by which this implicit knowledge is brought to the forefront of the decision-making process. Some definitions of intuition in the context of decision-making point to the importance of recognizing cues and patterns in one's environment and then using them to improve one's problem solving. Intuition in decision-making has been connected two assumptions: 1) Tacit decision - previous decisions are affecting and 2) Explicit decision - emotions are affecting.
 
Intuition's effect on decision-making is distinct from insight, which requires time to mature. A month spent pondering a math problem may lead to a gradual understanding of the answer, even if one does not know where that understanding came from. Intuition, in contrast, is a more instantaneous, immediate understanding upon first being confronted with the math problem. Intuition is also distinct from implicit knowledge and learning, which inform intuition but are separate concepts. Intuition is the mechanism by which implicit knowledge is made available during an instance of decision-making.

Channels of intuitive influence

Heuristics
Traditional research often points to the role of heuristics in helping people make "intuitive" decisions.  Those following the heuristics-and-biases school of thought developed by Amos Tversky and Daniel Kahneman believe that intuitive judgments are derived from an "informal and unstructured mode of reasoning" that ultimately does not include any methodical calculation.  Tversky and Kahneman identify availability, representativeness, and anchoring/adjustment as three heuristics that influence many intuitive judgments made under uncertain conditions.

The heuristics-and-biases approach looks at patterns of biased judgments to distinguish heuristics from normative reasoning processes. Early studies supporting this approach associated each heuristic with a set of biases. These biases were "departures from the normative rational theory" and helped identify the underlying heuristics.  Use of the availability heuristic, for example, leads to error whenever the memory retrieved is a biased recollection of actual frequency. This can be attributed to an individual's tendency to remember dramatic cases. Heuristic processes are quick intuitive responses to basic questions such as frequency.

Affect
Some researchers point to intuition as a purely affective phenomenon that demonstrates the ability of emotions to influence decision-making without cognitive mediation. This supports the dual processing theory of affect and cognition, under which conscious thought is not required for emotions to be experienced, but nevertheless positive conscious thoughts towards person's will have positive emotional affects on them.  In studies comparing affect and cognition, some researchers have found that positive mood is associated with reliance on affective signals while negative mood is associated with more deliberative thought processes. Mood is thus considered a moderator in the strategic decisions people carry out. In a series of three studies, the authors confirmed that people in a positive mood faced with a card-based gambling task utilized intuition to perform better at higher-risk stages than people who were in a negative mood.  Other theories propose that intuition has both cognitive and affective elements, bridging the gap between these two fundamentally different kinds of human information processing.

Comparison to other decision-making styles
Intuitive decision-making can be contrasted with deliberative decision-making, which is based on cognitive factors like beliefs, arguments, and reasons, commonly referred to as one's explicit knowledge. Intuitive decision-making is based on implicit knowledge relayed to the conscious mind at the point of decision through affect or unconscious cognition. Some studies also suggest that intuitive decision-making relies more on the mind's parallel processing functions, while deliberative decision-making relies more on sequential processing.

Prevalence of intuitive judgment and measurement of use
Although people use intuitive and deliberative decision-making modes interchangeably, individuals value the decisions they make more when they are allowed to make them using their preferred style.  This specific kind of regulatory fit is referred to as decisional fit. The emotions people experience after a decision is made tend to be more pleasant when the preferred style is used, regardless of the decision outcome. Some studies suggest that the mood with which the subject enters the decision-making process can also affect the style they choose to employ: sad people tend to be more deliberative, while people in a happy mood rely more on intuition.

The Preference for Intuition and Deliberation Scale developed by Coralie Bestch in 2004 measures propensity toward intuitiveness. The scale defines preference for intuition as tendency to use affect ("gut-feel") as a basis for decision-making instead of cognition. The Myers-Briggs Type Indicator is also sometimes used.

Intuitive decision-making in specific environments

Management and decision-making
Researchers have also explored the efficacy of intuitive judgments and the debate on the function of intuition versus analysis in decisions that require specific expertise, as in management of organizations. In this context, intuition is interpreted as an "unconscious expertise" rather than a traditionally purely heuristic response. Research suggests that this kind of intuition is based on a "broad constellation of past experiences, knowledge, skills, perceptions and feelings."  The efficacy of intuitive decision-making in the management environment is largely dependent on the decision context and decision maker's expertise.

The expertise-based intuition increases over time when the employee gets more experience regarding the organization worked for and by gathering domain-specific knowledge. In this context the so-called intuition is not just series of random guesses, but rather a process of combining expertise and know-how with the employee's instincts. Intuitions can, however be difficult to prove to be right in terms of decision-making. It is in most situations likely, that decisions based on intuition are harder to justify than those that are based in rational analysis. Especially in the context of business and organizational decision-making, one should be able to justify their decisions, thus making them purely intuitively is often not possible. It is debated upon whether intuition is accurate, but evidence has been shown that under aforementioned conditions it can. The organizations should not base their decisions on just intuitive or rational analysis. The effective organizations need both rational and intuitive decision-making processes and combination of those. When it comes to the decision maker him/herself, mainly two factors affect the effectiveness of intuitive decision-making. These factors have been found to be the amount of expertise the person has and the individuals processing style.

Finance
A study of traders from the four largest investment banks in London looked at the role that emotion and expert intuition play in financial trading decisions. This study reported on the differences between how higher and lower performing traders incorporate intuition in their decision strategy, and attributed the success of some higher performing traders to their great disposition to reflect critically about their intuitions. This propensity to think critically about intuition and the source of those hunches served as a distinguishing factor between the higher and lower performing traders included in the study. While successful traders were more open to this critical introspection, lower performing traders were reported to rely on their feelings alone rather than further explore the affective influences for their decisions. Reflection on the origin of feelings by expert traders may be particularly salient given affect-as-information model, which holds that the impact of emotions on behavior is reduced or even disappears when the relevance of those emotions is explicitly called into question. It has been noted in a research, that intuition is used as a method of decision-making in the banking industry. Record shows that intuition is used in combination with pre-existing solution models and previous experiences. Participants of the research also reported to analyse their intuitive decisions afterwards and possibly altering them.

High-risk situations
Traditional literature attributes the role of judgment processes in risk perception and decision-making to cognition rather than emotion. However, more recent studies suggest a link between emotion and cognition as it relates to decision-making in high-risk environments. Studies of decision-making in high-risk environments suggest that individuals who self-identify as intuitive decision-makers tend to make faster decisions that imply greater deviation from risk neutrality than those who prefer the deliberative style.  For example, risk-averse intuitive decision-makers will choose to not participate in a dangerous event more quickly than deliberative decision-makers, but will choose not to participate in more instances than their deliberative counterparts.

Strategic decisions 
Strategic decisions are usually made by the top management in the organizations. Usually strategic decisions also effect on the future of the organization. Rationality has been the guideline and also justified way to make decisions because they are based on facts. Intuition in strategic decision making is less examined and for example can be depending on a case be described as managers know-how, expertise or just a gut feeling, hunch.

See also
Intuitionistic logic

Sources

Cognition